The York Rangers was an infantry regiment of the Non-Permanent Active Militia of the Canadian Militia (now the Canadian Army). Although the unit was first officially created in 1866, the regiment traces its ancestry and origins as far back to Rogers' Rangers of the Seven Years' War, the Queen's Rangers of the American Revolutionary War and also the York Militia of the War of 1812. In 1936, the regiment was amalgamated with The Queen's Rangers (1st American Regiment) to form The Queen's York Rangers (1st American Regiment).

Lineage

The York Rangers 

 Originated on 14 September 1866, in Aurora, Ontario, as the 12th York Battalion of Infantry.
 Redesignated on 10 May 1872, as the 12th Battalion of Infantry or York Rangers.
 Redesignated on 8 May 1900, as the 12th Regiment York Rangers.
 Redesignated on 1 May 1920, as The York Rangers.
 Amalgamated on 15 December 1936, with The Queen's Rangers (1st American Regiment) and redesignated as The Queen's York Rangers (1st American Regiment) (MG).

Lineage Chart

Perpetuations 

 35th Battalion, CEF
 127th Battalion (12th York Rangers), CEF
 220th Battalion (12th Regiment York Rangers), CEF

History

North-West Rebellion 
On 10 April, 1885, the 12th York Rangers mobilized four companies for active service during the North-West Rebellion with the York and Simcoe Provisional Battalion. The battalion served in the Alberta Column of the North West Field Force. On 24 July 1885, these companies were removed from active service.

Great War 
When the Canadian Expeditionary Force was raised in September 1914, the 12th York Rangers contributed drafts to help raise the 4th Battalion (Central Ontario), CEF. The regiment also contributed drafts to help form the 20th Battalion (Central Ontario), CEF.

On 7 November, 1914, the 35th Battalion, CEF was authorized for service. On 9 February 1915, the battalion was redesignated as the 35th Reserve Battalion, CEF and on 16 October, 1915, the battalion embarked for Great Britain. After its arrival in the UK, the battalion provided reinforcements to the Canadian Corps in the field. On 4 January, 1917, the battalion’s personnel were absorbed by the 4th Reserve Battalion, CEF. On 8 December, 1917, the 35th Battalion, CEF was disbanded.

On 22 December, 1915, the 127th Battalion (12th York Rangers), CEF was authorized for service and on 21 August, 1916, the battalion embarked for Great Britain. After its arrival in the UK, the battalion provided reinforcements to the Canadian Corps in the field. On 20 November, 1916, the battalion was reorganized as a railway battalion. On 13 January, 1917, the battalion disembarked in France and on 3 February, 1917, the battalion was redesignated the 2nd Battalion, Canadian Railway Troops, CEF. From 1917 until early 1918, the battalion provided special light railway engineering services to the British Expeditionary Force in France and Flanders. During the German Spring Offensive of 1918, the battalion would resume its original infantry role continued in the Allied Frontline until the Amiens Offensive of August 1918. Soon after, the battalion resumed its railway battalion role until the end of the war. On 23 October, 1920, the 127th Battalion (12th York Rangers), CEF was disbanded.

On 15 July, 1916, the 220th Battalion (12th Regiment York Rangers), CEF was authorized for service and on 26 January, 1917, the battalion embarked for Great Britain. On 7 May, 1917, the battalion’s personnel were absorbed by the 3rd Reserve Battalion, CEF to provide reinforcements for the Canadian Corps in the field. On 1 September, 1917, the 220th Battalion, CEF was disbanded.

Organization

12th York Battalion of Infantry (14 September 1866) 

 No. 1 Company (Scarborough, Ontario) (first raised in September 1862 as the Scarborough Rifle Company)
 No. 2 Company (Aurora, Ontario) (first raised in December 1862 as the Aurora Infantry Company)
 No. 3 Company (Lloydtown, Ontario) (first raised in December 1862 as the Lloydtown Infantry Company; absorbed in 1872 by the Aurora company)
 No. 4 Company (King, Ontario) (first raised in January 1863 as the King Rifle Company)
 No. 5 Company (Newmarket, Ontario)

12th York Battalion of Infantry (October 1866) 

 Regimental Headquarters (Newmarket, Ontario)
 No. 1 Company (Scarborough, Ontario)
 No. 2 Company (Aurora, Ontario)
 No. 3 Company (Lloydtown, Ontario) (absorbed in 1872 by the Aurora company)
 No. 4 Company (King, Ontario)
 No. 5 Company (Newmarket, Ontario)
 No. 6 Company (Keswick, Ontario; moved in 1867 to Sutton, Ontario)
 No. 7 Company (Markham, Ontario)
 No. 8 Company (Sharon, Ontario)
 No. 9 Company (Unionville, Ontario) (raised in November 1866)

The York Rangers (01 December, 1920) 

 Regimental Headquarters (Aurora, Ontario)
 1st Battalion (Aurora, Ontario) (perpetuating the 127th Battalion, CEF)
 2nd Battalion (perpetuating the 35th Battalion, CEF)
 3rd (Reserve) Battalion (perpetuating the 127th Battalion, CEF)
 4th (Reserve) Battalion (perpetuating the 220th Battalion, CEF)

The York Rangers (01 August, 1925) 

 Regimental Headquarters (Aurora, Ontario)
 1st Battalion (Aurora, Ontario) (perpetuating the 127th Battalion, CEF)
 2nd (Reserve) Battalion (perpetuating the 35th Battalion, CEF (jointly with The Queen's Rangers))
 3rd (Reserve) Battalion (perpetuating the 220th Battalion CEF)

Alliances 
  - The Green Howards (Alexandra, Princess of Wales's Own Yorkshire Regiment) (Until 1936)

Battle honours

North West Rebellion 

 North West Canada, 1885

Great War 

 Ypres, 1915, '17
 Festubert, 1915
 Mount Sorrel
 Somme, 1916, '18
 Arras, 1917, '18
 Hill 70
 Pilckem
 Langemarck, 1917
 Menin Road
 Polygon Wood
 Broodseinde
 Poelcappelle
 Passchendaele
 St. Quentin
 Amiens
 Hindenburg Line
 Pursuit to Mons
 France and Flanders, 1915–18

Notes and references 

Ranger regiments of Canada
Queen's York Rangers (1st American Regiment)
Military units and formations established in 1866
Military units and formations disestablished in 1936
Military units and formations of Ontario